Toast Skagen is a Swedish starter and food dish. It consists of pieces of toasted bread and a prawn salad called skagenröra, typically made with mayonnaise, sourcream and dill, sometimes dijon mustard, and garnished with roe.  Sometimes crab or crabsticks are substituted for prawns. The name of the dish stems from Skagen in Denmark, where it is also popular, but going under the name Skagenssalat. The dish was created by the Stockholm-based restaurateur and chef Tore Wretman. He introduced Toast Skagen to the public in the 1950s.

See also
List of toast dishes

References

Toast dishes
Swedish cuisine